Tristram Hyde House is a historic two-story home in Charleston, South Carolina constructed in 1914 for Tristram Hyde,  who soon after became mayor of Charleston in 1915. It was designed by local architect Albert Wheeler Todd.

Designed in a Neoclassical Revival architecture style, the residence includes two-story Ionic columned portico. The features are also described as being Federal Style architecture, including a front entry bordered by trimmed fanlight and sidelights.

References

Further reading
"Charleston County GIS". Charleston County Government. ccgisweb.charlestoncounty.org/website/Charleston/viewer.htm (accessed June 14, 2010).
Jonathan H. Poston, The Buildings of Charleston: A Guide to the City's Architecture. Columbia, South Carolina: University of South Carolina Press, 1997.

Houses in Charleston, South Carolina
Neoclassical architecture in South Carolina
Houses completed in 1914